All the Weird Kids Up Front (Más Rolas Chidas) is a compilation album by American rock band Spoon. It was released on August 29, 2020, for Record Store Day, through Matador Records. It is a companion piece to their 2019 greatest hits album Everything Hits at Once: The Best of Spoon, with a track listing submitted and voted on by fans. The compilation was announced on March 5, 2020. The album peaked at number 77 on the Billboard Top Current Albums chart.

Track listing

References 

2020 compilation albums
Spoon (band) albums
Record Store Day releases
Matador Records compilation albums